The 1990–91 FIS Cross-Country World Cup was the 10th official World Cup season in cross-country skiing for men and women. The World Cup started in Tauplitzalm, Austria, on 8 December 1990 and finished at Holmenkollen, Oslo, Norway, on 16 March 1991. Vladimir Smirnov of the Soviet Union won the overall men's cup, and Yelena Välbe of the Soviet Union won the women's.

Calendar

Men

Women

Note: Until 1999 World Championships, World Championship races are part of the World Cup. Hence results from those races are included in the World Cup overall.

Men's team

Women's team

Overall standings

Men's standings

Women's standings

Achievements
Victories in this World Cup (all-time number of victories as of 1990–91 season in parentheses)

Men
 , 3 (7) first places
 , 2 (9) first places
 , 2 (5) first places
 , 1 (30) first place
 , 1 (3) first place
 , 1 (2) first place
 , 1 (1) first place
 , 1 (1) first place

Women
 , 8 (15) first places
 , 1 (2) first place
 , 1 (4) first place
 , 1 (3) first place
 , 1 (1) first place

References

FIS Cross-Country World Cup seasons
World Cup 1990-91
World Cup 1990-91